Heavy fuel oil (HFO) is a category of fuel oils of a tar-like consistency. Also known as bunker fuel, or residual fuel oil, HFO is the result or remnant from the distillation and cracking process of petroleum. For this reason, HFO is contaminated with several different compounds including aromatics, sulfur and nitrogen, making emissions upon combustion more polluting compared to other fuel oils. HFO is predominantly used as a fuel source for marine vessel propulsion due to its relatively low cost compared to cleaner fuel sources such as distillates. The use and carriage of HFO on-board vessels presents several environmental concerns, namely the risk of oil spill and the emission of toxic compounds and particulates including black carbon. Presently, the use of HFOs is banned as a fuel source for ships travelling in the Antarctic as part of the International Maritime Organization's (IMO) International Code for Ships Operating in Polar Waters (Polar Code). For similar reasons, an HFO ban in Arctic waters is currently being considered.

Heavy fuel oil characteristics 
HFO consists of the remnants or residual of petroleum sources once the hydrocarbons of higher quality are extracted via processes such as thermal and catalytic cracking. Thus, HFO is also commonly referred to as residual fuel oil. The chemical composition of HFO is highly variable due to the fact that HFO is often mixed or blended with cleaner fuels, blending streams can include carbon numbers from C20 to greater than C50. HFOs are blended to achieve certain viscosity and flow characteristics for a given use. As a result of the wide compositional spectrum, HFO is defined by processing, physical and final use characteristics. Being the final remnant of the cracking process, HFO also contains mixtures of the following compounds to various degrees: "paraffins, cycloparaffins, aromatics, olefins, and asphaltenes as well as molecules containing sulfur, oxygen, nitrogen and/or organometals". HFO is characterized by a maximum density of 1010 kg/m3 at 15°C, and a maximum viscosity of 700 mm2/s (cSt) at 50°C according to ISO 8217.

Combustion and atmospheric reactions 
Given HFO elevated sulfur contamination (maximum of 5% by mass), the combustion reaction results in the formation of  sulfur dioxide SO2 which will eventually lead to the formation of acid rain (sulfuric acid or H2SO4) in the atmosphere.

Example of formation of acid rain:

OH + SO2 → HOSO2

HOSO2 + O2 → HO2 + SO3

SO3 + H2O → H2SO4

Resulting formation of nitric acid (HNO3) a component of acid rain:

H2O + N2 + NO2 → HNO3 + HNO2

3 HNO2 → HNO3 + 2 NO + H2O

4NO + 3 O2 + 2 H2O → 4HNO3

Heavy fuel oil use and shipping 
Since the middle of the 19th century, HFO has been used primarily by the shipping industry due to its low cost compared with all other fuel oils, being up to 30% less expensive, as well as the historically lax regulatory requirements for emissions of nitrogen oxides (NOx) and sulfur dioxide (SO2) by the IMO. For these two reasons, HFO is the single most widely used engine fuel oil on-board ships. Data available until 2007 for global consumption of HFO at the international marine sector reports total fuel oil usages of 200 million tonnes, with HFO consumption accounting for 174 million tonnes. Data available until 2011 for fuel oil sales to the international marine shipping sector reports 207.5 million tonnes total fuel oil sales with HFO accounting for 177.9 million tonnes.

Marine vessels can use a variety of different fuels for the purpose of propulsion, which are divided into two broad categories: residual oils or distillates. In contrast to HFOs, distillates are the petroleum products created through refining crude oil and include diesel, kerosene, naphtha and gas. Residual oils are often combined to various degrees with distillates to achieve desired properties for operational and/or environmental performance. Table 1 lists commonly used categories of marine fuel oil and mixtures; all mixtures including the low sulfur marine fuel oil are still considered HFO.

Arctic environmental concerns 

The use and carriage of HFO in the Arctic is a commonplace marine industry practice. In 2015, over 200 ships entered Arctic waters carrying a total of 1.1 million tonnes of fuel with 57% of fuel consumed during Arctic voyages being HFO. In the same year, trends in carriage of HFO  were reported to be 830,000 tonnes, representing a significant growth from the reported 400,000 tonnes  in 2012. A report in 2017 by Norwegian Type Approval body Det Norske Veritas (DNV GL) calculated the total fuel use of HFO by mass in the Arctic to be over 75% with larger vessels being the main consumers. In light of increased area traffic and given that the Arctic is considered to be a sensitive ecological area with a higher response intensity to climate change, the environmental risks posed by HFO present concern for  environmentalists and governments in the area. The two main environmental concerns for HFO in the Arctic are the risk of spill or accidental discharge and the emission of black carbon as a result of HFO consumption.

Environmental impacts of heavy fuel oil spills 
Due to its very high viscosity and elevated density, HFO released into the environment is a greater threat to flora and fauna compared to distillate or other residual fuels. In 2009, the Arctic Council identified the spill of oil in the Arctic as the greatest threat to the local marine environment. Being the remnant of the distillation and cracking processes, HFO is characterized by an elevated overall toxicity compared to all other fuels. Its viscosity prevents breakdown into the environment, a property exacerbated by the cold temperatures in the Arctic resulting in the formation of tar-lumps, and an increase in volume through emulsification. Its density, tendency to persist and emulsify can result in HFO polluting both the water column and seabed.

History of heavy fuel oil spill incidents since 2000 
The following HFO specific spills have occurred since the year 2000. The information is organized according to year, ship name, amount released and the spill location:

 2011 Golden Traded (205 tons in Skagerrak)
 2011 Godafoss, Malaysia (200,000 gallons in Hvaler Islands)
 2009 Full City, Panama (6,300-9,500 gallons in Langesund)
 2004 Selendang Ayu, Malaysia (336,000 gallons in Unalaska Island - near Arctic)
 2003 Fu Shan Hai, China (1,680 tons in the Baltic Sea)
 2002 Prestige oil spill, Spain (17.8 million gallons in Atlantic Ocean)
 2001 Baltic Carrier, Marshall Islands (2350 tons in the Baltic Sea)
 2000 Janra, Germany (40 tons in the Sea of Åland)

Environmental impacts of heavy fuel oil use 
The combustion of HFO in ship engines results in the highest amount of black carbon emissions compared to all other fuels. The choice of marine fuel is the most important determinant of ship engine emission factors for black carbon. The second most important factor in the emission of black carbon is the ship load size, with emission factors of black carbon increasing up to six times given low engine loads. Black carbon is the product of incomplete combustion and a component of soot and fine particulate matter (<2.5 μg). It has a short atmospheric lifetime of a few days to a week and is typically removed upon precipitation events. Although there has been debate concerning the radiative forcing  of black carbon, combinations of ground and satellite observations suggest a global solar absorption of 0.9W·m−2, making it the second most important climate forcer after CO2. Black carbon affects the climate system by: decreasing the snow/ice albedo through dark soot deposits and increasing snowmelt timing, reducing the planetary albedo through absorption of solar radiation reflected by the cloud systems, earth surface and atmosphere, as well as directly decreasing cloud albedo with black carbon contamination of water and ice found therein. The greatest increase in Arctic surface temperature per unit of black carbon emissions results from the decrease in snow/ice albedo which makes Arctic specific black carbon release more detrimental than emissions elsewhere.

IMO and the Polar Code 
The International Maritime Organization (IMO), a specialized arm of the United Nations, adopted into force on 1 January 2017 the International Code for Ships Operating in Polar Waters or Polar Code. The requirements of the Polar Code are mandatory under both the International Convention for the Prevention of Pollution from Ships (MARPOL) and the International Convention for the Safety of Life at Sea (SOLAS). The two broad categories covered by the Polar Code include safety and pollution prevention related to navigation in both Arctic and Antarctic polar waters.

The carriage and use of HFO in the Arctic is discouraged by the Polar Code while being banned completely from the Antarctic under MARPOL Annex I regulation 43. The ban of HFO use and carriage in the Antarctic precedes the adoption of the Polar Code. At its 60th session (26 March 2010), The Marine Environmental Protection Committee (MEPC) adopted Resolution 189(60) which went into effect in 2011 and prohibits fuels of the following characteristics:
 crude oils having a density at 15°C higher than 900 kg/m3 ;
 oils, other than crude oils, having a density at 15°C higher than 900 kg/m3 or a kinematic viscosity at 50°C higher than 180 mm2 /s; or
 bitumen, tar and their emulsions.
IMO's Marine Environmental Protection Committee (MEPC) tasked the Pollution Prevention Response Sub-Committee (PPR) to enact a ban on the use and carriage of heavy fuel in Arctic waters at its 72nd and 73rd sessions. This task is also accompanied by a requirement to properly define HFO taking into account its current definition under  MARPOL Annex I regulation 43. The adoption of the ban is anticipated for 2021, with widespread implementation by 2023.

Resistance to heavy fuel oil phase-out 
The Clean Arctic Alliance was the first IMO delegate nonprofit organization to campaign against the use of HFO in Arctic waters. However, the phase-out and ban of HFO in the Arctic was formally proposed to MEPC by eight countries in 2018: Finland, Germany, Iceland, the Netherlands, New Zealand, Norway, Sweden and the United States.   Although these member states continue to support the initiative, several countries have been vocal about their resistance to an HFO ban on such a short time scale. The Russian Federation has expressed concern for impacts to the maritime shipping industry and trade given the relatively low cost of HFO. Russia instead suggested the development and implementation of mitigation measures for the use and carriage of HFO in Arctic waters. Canada and Marshall Islands have presented similar arguments, highlighting the potential impacts on Arctic communities (namely remote indigenous populations) and economies.

To appease concerns and resistance, at its 6th session in February 2019, the PPR sub-committee working group developed a "draft methodology for analyzing impacts" of HFO to be finalized at PPR's 7th session in 2020. The purpose of the methodology being to evaluate the ban according to its economic and social impacts on Arctic indigenous communities and other local communities, to measure anticipated benefits to local ecosystems, and potentially consider other factors that could be positively or negatively affected by the ban.

References 



See also 
 Mazut

Oils
Petroleum products
IARC Group 2B carcinogens
Liquid fuels